Florante de Leon, popularly known simply as Florante, is a Filipino singer-songwriter.

Career
He was a pioneer and leading exponent of Pinoy folk rock during the DZRJ-AM radio boom in Manila during the 1970s. His more popular singles include the hit ballad, "Handog" (Offering) and other songs, such as "Ako'y Pinoy" (I Am A Filipino), "Abakada" (A-B-C-D), "Digmaan" (War) and "Pinay" (Filipino Woman), which form part of the musical genre called Manila sound.  He influenced other singer-songwriters that followed, particularly during the emergence of OPM; these artists include Joey Ayala, Freddie Aguilar and Heber Bartolome.

Manila sound
Even though a folk singer, Florante also became a part of the 1970s Manila sound. In 2006, Join the Club's hard rock revival of "Handog" was included in the Hopia Mani Popcorn revival album.

References

External links

20th-century Filipino male singers
Filipino folk singers
Living people
Date of birth missing (living people)
Year of birth missing (living people)
Filipino rock musicians